Nicholas Courtenay Stringer (born ) is a former international rugby union player, a full back, who gained 5 caps for England between 1982 and 1985.  He played with the London Wasps.

References 

Living people
1960 births
People from Harrow, London
England international rugby union players
Wasps RFC players
English rugby union players
Rugby union fullbacks
Middlesex County RFU players